Red also known as Miss Vavoom is an American animated character, created by Tex Avery, who appears in several MGM short films and Tom and Jerry films. She is a fictional nightclub singer and dancer who is usually making all men in the room crazy, especially a Wolf character who — in vain — tries to seduce and chase her. Red debuted in MGM's  Red Hot Riding Hood (May 8, 1943), a modern-day variant of the fairy tale "Little Red Riding Hood".

She appeared in seven animated shorts in the Golden age of American animation, and was revived to appear in many Hanna-Barbera TV cartoon series from the 1990s on.

History
According to Avery, the character originated at the army, where he helped the sergeant plan training films for the animators at MGM. When the film was finished, Avery got down to the projection room, where he always "ran the picture for the producer and the whole group". When the sergeant spotted the picture, much like the wolf, he roared. Word soon spread about the picture among the army. The version he showed was the uncensored version, which had a scene that the grandma marries the wolf and has children with him, and the Hays Office found that the scene strongly suggested bestiality. The scene was ultimately cut for the theatrical release. 

The character was designed by Claude Smith and animated by Preston Blair, who said that the picture originally was just planned around the wolf and the grandmother (which her design was inspired by the caricatures of Peter Arno), but they soon focused mainly on Red. In fact, the character was not rotoscoped, but in fact was drawn from his own imagination.   The first cartoon, garnering 15,000 bookings, was so successful that it garnered various sequels, the first being The Shooting of Dan McGoo.

Appearances

Theatrical shorts

Television
 Tom & Jerry Kids (1990) as Miss Vavoom
 Droopy, Master Detective (1993) as Miss Vavoom

Films
 Quest for Camelot (1998) (Cameo)
 Tom and Jerry Meet Sherlock Holmes (2010)
 Tom and Jerry: Robin Hood and His Merry Mouse (as Maid Marian) (2012)
 Tom and Jerry's Giant Adventure (2013)

Video games
 Droopy's Tennis Open (2002) as Bubbles Vavoom

Comics
 Wolf & Red (1995) (Dark Horse Comics)
 Droopy (1995) (Dark Horse Comics)
 Comics and Stories (1996) (Dark Horse Comics)

Known voices
Red is voiced by the following characters

 Sara Berner (Debut, 1943–1945) Speaking Voice
 Connie Russell (Debut, 1943) Singing Voice
 Colleen Collins (1945) Speaking Voice
 Imogene Lynn (1945) Singing Voice
 Ann Pickard (1945) Singing Voice
 Teresa Ganzel (1990–1994) ... Miss Vavoom
 Grey DeLisle (1996, 2010–2013)

References

Animated film series
MGM cartoon characters
Film characters introduced in 1943
Film series introduced in 1943
Animated human characters
Comedy film characters
Fictional singers
Fictional dancers
Droopy
Tex Avery
Female characters in animation
Works based on Little Red Riding Hood
Metro-Goldwyn-Mayer cartoon studio film series